Cameron Chism (born December 25, 1990) is a former American football defensive back. He played college football at the University of Maryland, College Park and attended Bishop McNamara High School in Forestville, Maryland. He was a member of the Indianapolis Colts and BC Lions.

Professional career
Chism signed with the Indianapolis Colts of the National Football League (NFL) after going undrafted in the 2012 NFL Draft on April 29, 2012. He was released on August 26 of the same year.

Chism was signed to the practice squad of the BC Lions of the Canadian Football League on August 12, 2013. He was released on June 15, 2014.

References

External links
College stats
BC Lions profile
Maryland Terrapins bio
Indianapolis Colts bio
Fanbase bio
NFL Draft Scout
Just Sports Stats

Living people
1990 births
American football defensive backs
Canadian football defensive backs
African-American players of American football
African-American players of Canadian football
Maryland Terrapins football players
Indianapolis Colts players
BC Lions players
Players of American football from Washington, D.C.
21st-century African-American sportspeople